High Steel is a 1965 short National Film Board of Canada documentary film directed by Don Owen about Mohawk Ironworkers from Kahnawake building New York City skycrapers.

Synopsis 
Featuring breathtaking sequences of workers walking along narrow steel beams high above street level, High Steel is based largely on the experiences of one Mohawk ironworker working in Manhattan, Harold McComber. The film contrasts the daring work of McComber and his coworkers in the skies above New York with life back home in Kahnawake. It also explains how the Mohawk people living across the Saint Lawrence River from Montreal first gained their reputation for high steel work in the late 19th century, working on a railway bridge that ran through their land. However, as the film recounts through narration and archival photos, such a reputation came at a terrible cost: while working on the Quebec Bridge further down river near Quebec City, dozens of Mohawks were among the 75 men killed during its 1907 construction collapse—with a devastating impact on the small community. While celebrating their courage and skill, the film also makes plain how Mohawks are forced to leave home in order to make a living, with McComber regretting that his sons have had to grow up without their father.

Production 
The film's director of photography was John Spotton, with Don Francks as narrator, Julian Biggs as producer, and with a song by Bruce Mackay, "Mountains of Iron and Steel" (replacing Gordon Lightfoot, who was originally supposed to have provided music). The film was shot using 35 mm cameras, with film crews having to gain access to the construction site high above the ground by traversing a ladder from an adjacent building.

Awards 
 Cork International Film Festival, Cork, Ireland: Bronze Statuette of St. Finbarr - First Prize,  Documentary, 1966
 Locarno Film Festival, Locarno, Switzerland: Diploma of Honour, 1967
 Kraków Film Festival, Kraków, Poland: Diploma of Honour, 1967
 Melbourne Film Festival, Melbourne: Diploma of Merit, 1967
International Days of Short Films, Tours, France: Prize of the Cine-Clubs, 1967
 Berlin International Film Festival, Berlin: Special Youth Prize, 1967
 18th Canadian Film Awards, Montreal: Best Editing, to Don Owen 1966

Further reading

References

External links

 (requires Adobe Flash)

1965 short films
Films directed by Don Owen
Documentary films about First Nations
Documentary films about New York City
Films set in Manhattan
National Film Board of Canada short films
National Film Board of Canada documentaries
First Nations history in Quebec
Mohawk culture
Canadian short documentary films
Quebec films
1960s English-language films
English-language Canadian films
First Nations films
1960s Canadian films